Królewice may refer to the following places:
Królewice, Kazimierza County in Świętokrzyskie Voivodeship (south-central Poland)
Królewice, Sandomierz County in Świętokrzyskie Voivodeship (south-central Poland)
Królewice, West Pomeranian Voivodeship (north-west Poland)